For the American policy advisor, see Stacy Dean.

Stacy Dean Campbell (born July 27, 1967) is an American singer-songwriter, author, and TV host.

Life and career
Campbell's father was a gospel singer, touring with many notable quartets and along with other members of "The Singing Campbell Family" is an inductee in the Texas Gospel Music Hall of Fame. Raised by his mother in Oklahoma and New Mexico, Campbell began his music career singing in clubs around the Oklahoma University campus and soon moved to Nashville. In 1991 he signed a contract to become a staff songwriter for Tree Music, and released his first album as a solo artist on Columbia Records in 1992. Three singles from his debut album hit the Billboard Country singles chart.

Campbell released a follow-up album on Columbia in 1995 and in 1999 he moved to the Warner Brothers label and shifted his focus to making an album that featured more of his songwriting. The result was "Ashes of Old Love" which reached the number 3 position on the Americana Music Chart. In 2000, Campbell and Dean Miller co-wrote Trace Adkins' single "I'm Gonna Love You Anyway".

In 2001 Campbell left the music business and returned to New Mexico where he began work on a writing project and in 2004, his first novel, Cottonwood, was published. The book is set in West Texas in 1937. Included with the book is a CD which features 12 original tracks inspired by the novel and composed by Campbell.

In recent years, Campbell has expanded his career and moved behind the scenes, working as a director-writer in music videos and short films. He is the creator of the Americana Travel series, Bronco Roads, a syndicated travel series that showcases life in the American West. Campbell serves as host.

Discography

Albums

Singles

Music videos

Track listing

References

1967 births
Living people
American country singer-songwriters
Singers from New Mexico
Columbia Records artists
Warner Records artists
American male singer-songwriters
People from Carlsbad, New Mexico
20th-century American singers
20th-century American male singers
21st-century American male singers
21st-century American singers